= Mormonda =

Town in Ancient lonia (Anatolia)

Coordinates: 38°31′39″N 27°11′57″E

Mormonda was a town of ancient Ionia. Its site is located close to İzmir (ancient Smyrna), Asiatic Turkey.
